Sarah Jane Pitt is a microbiologist at the University of Brighton and fellow of the Institute of Biomedical Science (IBMS). She has published three books on biomedical science, parasitology, and clinical microbiology with an emphasis on laboratory practice. She is the IBMS's chief examiner in virology.

Selected publications
 Introduction to Biomedical Science in Clinical and Professional Practice (with Jim Cunningham)
 Parasitology: An Integrated Approach (with Alan Gunn)
 Clinical Microbiology for Diagnostic and Laboratory Scientists

References

External links 
Sarah Pitt talking about Covid-19
https://theconversation.com/profiles/sarah-pitt-808299

Living people
Year of birth missing (living people)
Academics of the University of Brighton
Alumni of Liverpool John Moores University
British women scientists
Alumni of the University of Bristol
Alumni of the Liverpool School of Tropical Medicine
Women microbiologists
Women parasitologists